Events from the year 1602 in art.

Events
 (unknown)

Paintings

Pieter Brueghel the Younger - The Procession to Calvary
Caravaggio
The Inspiration of Saint Matthew
The Taking of Christ
Amor Vincit Omnia
Saint Matthew and the Angel
John the Baptist (Youth with a Ram)
The Incredulity of Saint Thomas
Karel van Mander - Garden of Love

Births
March 4 - Kanō Tanyū, Japanese painter (died 1674)
May 26 - Philippe de Champaigne, Brabançon-born French Baroque portrait painter (died 1674)
date unknown
Andrea Camassei, Italian painter active in Rome under the patronage of the Barberini (died 1649)
Francesco Costanzo Cattaneo, Italian painter of primarily soldiers and banditti (died 1665)
Michelangelo Cerquozzi, Italian painter of small canvases of genre scenes (died 1660)
Anthonie Palamedesz., Dutch painter (died 1673)
Antonio de Puga, Spanish Baroque painter (died 1648)
Evert van Aelst, Dutch painter of still lifes (died 1657)
probable
Jacobus Mancadan, Dutch Golden Age painter mostly known for his pastoral landscapes (died 1680)
Abel Schrøder, Danish woodcarver (died 1676)
Salomon van Ruysdael, Dutch Golden Age landscape painter (died 1670)

Deaths
March 22 - Agostino Carracci, Italian printmaker (born 1557)
August 23 - Sebastiano Filippi, Italian late Renaissance-Mannerist painter of the School of Ferrara (born 1536)
October 7 - Thomas Schweicker, disabled German painter and calligrapher (born 1540)
November 22 - Toussaint Dubreuil, French painter (born 1561)
date unknown
Giacomo della Porta, Italian architect and sculptor (born c.1533)
Aert Mijtens, Flemish Renaissance painter (born 1541)
Jan Nagel, Dutch painter (born c.1560)
Daniël van den Queborn, Dutch painter (born 1552)
probable
Pierre Courteys, French enamel painters of Limoges, designer and colorist (born unknown)
Santi di Tito, Italian painter of Late-Mannerist or proto-Baroque style (born 1536)
Adrian Vanson, Flemish court portrait painter (born unknown)

 
Years of the 17th century in art
1600s in art